Te Moana O Raukawa Māori (Cook Strait Māori) and Te Ūpoko o te Ika a Māui Māori (lower North Island Māori) are a Māori iwi from Manawatu, Horowhenua, Kapiti Coast and Wellington. They include the iwi (tribes) of Rangitāne, Muaūpoko, Ngāti Raukawa, Ngāti Toa, Te Atiawa ki Whakarongotai, Te Āti Awa and Taranaki Whānui ki te Upoko o te Ika.

Te Āti Awa also has tribal lands in the South Island.

References